Father Michael Patella, OSB, is a monk of Saint John's Abbey, an author, theologian, and professor of theology at Saint John's University in Minnesota, United States.

He studied at the Pontifical Biblical Institute, Rome and at the École biblique et archéologique française de Jérusalem, Israel.

Sources
 St John's University

Bibliography
 Patella, Michael The Death of Jesus 1999 
 Patella, Michael The Gospel According to Luke 2005  
 Patella, Michael Lord of the Cosmos 2006 
 Patella, Michael Angels and Demons: A Christian Primer of the Spiritual World 2012 
 Patella, Michael Word and Image: The Hermeneutics of The Saint John's Bible 2013 

1954 births
Living people
Pontifical Biblical Institute alumni
20th-century American Roman Catholic theologians
21st-century American Roman Catholic theologians